State Highway 125 (SH 125) is a state highway in the U.S. state of Colorado. The highway runs north–south through Jackson and Grand counties in north central Colorado. It furnishes the principal north–south link through North Park and a connection to Middle Park over Willow Creek Pass. It is two-lane along its entire route. SH 125's southern terminus is at U.S. Route 40 (US 40) west of Granby, and the northern terminus is at Wyoming Highway 230 (WYO 230) at the Wyoming border.

Route description

At the northern end, the highway begins at the Wyoming state line, where it is contiguous with Wyoming Highway 230. It follows the North Platte River and Michigan River southward through Cowdrey and Walden, the county seat of Jackson County and the largest community along the road. At Walden it intersects State Highway 14. South of Walden, it crosses the southern end of North Park along the valley of the Illinois River, a tributary of the Michigan. It passes the unincorporated community of Rand, then ascends into the mountains and crosses the continental divide at Willow Creek Pass (elevation 9621 ft), one of the lowest crossings of the continental divide in Colorado. On the south side of the pass it descends the sparsely populated valley of Willow Creek into Middle Park. It terminates at its southern end at U.S. Highway 40 two miles (3.2 km) west of Granby.

Major intersections

See also

 List of state highways in Colorado

References

External links

125
Transportation in Jackson County, Colorado
Transportation in Grand County, Colorado